In linguistics, grammatical number is a grammatical category of nouns, pronouns, adjectives and verb agreement that expresses count distinctions (such as "one", "two" or "three or more"). English and other languages present number categories of singular or plural, both of which are cited by using the hash sign (#) or by the numero signs "No." and "Nos." respectively. Some languages also have a dual, trial and paucal number or other arrangements.

The count distinctions typically, but not always, correspond to the actual count of the referents of the marked noun or pronoun.

The word "number" is also used in linguistics to describe the distinction between certain grammatical aspects that indicate the number of times an event occurs, such as the semelfactive aspect, the iterative aspect, etc. For that use of the term, see "Grammatical aspect".

Overview
Most languages of the world have formal means to express differences of number. One widespread distinction, found in English and many other languages, involves a simple two-way number contrast between singular and plural (car/cars, child/children, etc.). Discussion of other more elaborate systems of number appears below.

Grammatical number is a morphological category characterized by the expression of quantity through inflection or agreement. As an example, consider the English sentences below:
 That apple on the table is fresh.
 Those two apples on the table are fresh.

The number of apples is marked on the noun—"apple" singular number (one item) vs. "apples" plural number (more than one item)—on the demonstrative, "that/those", and on the verb, "is/are". In the second sentence, all this information is redundant, since quantity is already indicated by the numeral "two".

A language has grammatical number when its nouns are subdivided into morphological classes according to the quantity they express, such that:
Every noun belongs to a unique number class (nouns are partitioned into disjoint classes by number).
Noun modifiers (such as adjectives) and verbs may also have different forms for each number class and be inflected to match the number of the nouns to which they refer (number is an agreement category).

This is partly the case in English: every noun is either singular or plural (a few forms, such as "fish" and "cannon", can be either, according to context), and at least some modifiers of nouns—namely the demonstratives, the personal pronouns, the articles, and verbs—are inflected to agree with the number of the nouns to which they refer: "this car" and "these cars" are correct, while "*this cars" or "*these car" are ungrammatical and, therefore, incorrect. However, adjectives are not inflected, and some verb forms do not distinguish between singular and plural ("She/They went", "She/They can go", "She/They had gone", "She/They will go"). Only count nouns can be freely used in the singular and in the plural. Mass nouns, like "milk", "silverware", and "wisdom", are normally used in only the singular form. (In some cases, a normally mass noun X may be used as a count noun to collect several distinct kinds of X into an enumerable group; for example, a cheesemaker might speak of goat, sheep, and cow milk as milks.) Many languages distinguish between count nouns and mass nouns.

Not all languages have number as a grammatical category. In those that do not, quantity must be expressed either directly, with numerals, or indirectly, through optional quantifiers. However, many of these languages compensate for the lack of grammatical number with an extensive system of measure words.

There is a hierarchy among number categories: no language distinguishes a trial (indicating the number 3) unless it has a dual, and no language has a dual without a plural.

Geographical distribution
Obligatory plural marking of all nouns is found throughout western and northern Eurasia and in most parts of Africa. The rest of the world presents a heterogeneous picture. Optional plural marking is particularly common in Southeast and East Asia and Australian languages, and complete lack of plural marking is particularly found in New Guinea and Australian languages. In addition to the areal correlations, there also seems to be at least one correlation with morphological typology: isolating languages appear to favor no or non-obligatory plural marking. This can be seen particularly in Africa, where optionality or absence of plural marking is found particularly in the isolating languages of West Africa.

Number in specific languages

Basque
Basque declension has four grammatical numbers: indefinite, definite singular, definite plural, and definite close plural:

 The indefinite is used after the question words Zer? ("What?"), Zein? ("Which?") and Zenbat? ("How much? / How many?"), after indefinite numerals, such as zenbait ("some"), hainbat ("several"), honenbeste / horrenbeste / hainbeste ("so many / so much"), bezainbeste ("as much as / as many as"), and before asko, anitz (this one can go before nouns), ugari, pilo bat, mordo bat, after makina bat ("much, many, a lot, lots of, plenty of..."), before gutxi ("a few, little") and batzuk ("some"), and the numbers, if they do not refer to a defined amount: Zer etxe eraberritu duzu? ("What house[s] have you renewed?"), Zer etxe eraberritu dituzu? ("What houses have you renewed?"). Zein etxetan bizi zinen? ("In what house[s] were you living?"). Zenbat etxe dituzu? ("How many houses have you got?"). Lapurrak hainbat etxetan sartu dira ("The thieves have broken into a number of houses"). Lapurra hainbeste etxetan sartu da! ("The thief has broken into so many houses!").

A noun followed by an adjective or a demonstrative is in the absolutive case, and the last word in the phrase is declined:
Etxea ("The house / House"). Etxe bat ("A house"). Etxe handi bat ("A big house"). Etxe handi batean ("In a big house"). Etxe handi hori ("That big house"). Etxe zuri handi horretan ("In that big white house").

If the amount is known, the plural grammatical numbers are used: Lapurrak bi etxetan sartu dira ("The thieves have broken in two houses" [indefinite: the houses are unknown to the speakers]). Lapurrak bizpahiru etxetan sartu dira ("The thieves have broken in two or three houses" [indefinite: the speakers does not know the exact amount of houses]). Lapurrak bi etxeetan sartu dira ("The thieves have broken in both houses" [definite plural: both are known to the speakers]). Lapurrak bi etxeotan sartu dira ("The thieves have broken in these two houses" [definite close plural: both are being shown by the speaker]).

The indefinite is also used in some idioms and set phrases: Egun on! ("Good day! / Good morning!"), On egin! ("Bon appetit!"), Etxez etxe ("From house to house"), Mezatara joan ("Go to the mass"), Etxe bila ibili ("To look for a house"), and as the root for compound words (etxe-galgarri, etxekalte, "Person or thing which brings loss to a home") or derivative words (etxeratu, "To go home / To send home"; etxekoi, "fond of home"; etxegile, "house-builder").

 The definite singular is used to designate a person or thing known or to present: Zer da eraikin hori? Nire etxea da. ("What is that building? It is my home"). Etxea nirea da ("The house is mine").

 The definite plural designates people or things known or present: Zer dira eraikin horiek? Nire etxeak dira. ("What are those buildings? They are my houses"). Etxeak nireak dira ("The houses are mine").

 The definite close plural refers to people or things which are in the vicinity of the speakers: Zer dira eraikinok? Nire etxeak dira. ("What are those buildings? They are my houses"). Etxeok nireak dira ("These houses are mine").

It is also used to include oneself in the group referred to: Nafarrak festazaleak dira ("The Navarrese like celebrations": the speaker is not a Navarrese). Nafarrok festazaleak gara ("We Navarrese like celebrations": the speaker is a Navarrese).

Verbs have four singular persons and three plural ones, as follows:

Singular:
 First person (the speaker): Euskalduna naiz ("I am Basque"). Testua idatzi dut ("I have written the text").
 Informal second person (the person the speaker is addressing to, i.e., an inferior, an animal, a child, a monologue with oneself): Euskalduna haiz ("Thou art Basque"). In some tenses, there are different verbs for a man or a woman: Testua idatzi duk ("Thou hast written the text [said to a man, a boy]", Testua idatzi dun ("Thou hast written the text [said to a woman, a girl]").
 Formal second person (the person the speaker is addressing to: a superior, somebody older, one's parents), the most frequent one: Euskalduna zara ("You [singular] are Basque"). Testua idatzi duzu ("You [sing.] have written the text").
 Third person (neither the speaker nor the listener): Handia da ("He / She / It is big"). Testua idatzi du ("He / She / It has written the text").

Plural:
 First person (the speaker and somebody else at least): Euskaldunak gara ("We are Basque"). Testua idatzi dugu ("We have written the text").
 Second person (the addressees): Euskaldunak zarete ("You [plural] are Basque [said to a group, either informally or formally]"). Testua idatzi duzue ("You [pl.] have written the text").
 Third person (more than one person outside the conversation): Handiak dira ("They are big"). Testua idatzi dute ("They have written the text").

English

English is typical of most world languages, in distinguishing only between singular and plural number. Singular corresponds to exactly one (or minus one), while plural applies to all other cases, including more and less than one or even 1.0. The plural form of a noun is usually created by adding the suffix -(e)s. The pronouns have irregular plurals, as in "I" versus "we", because they are ancient and frequently used words going back to when English had a well developed system of declension. English verbs distinguish singular from plural number in the third person present tense ("He goes" versus "They go"). Old English also contained dual grammatical numbers; Modern English retains a few residual terms reflective of dual number (such as both and neither, as opposed to all and none respectively), but they are generally considered to no longer constitute a separate grammatical number.

Finnish

The Finnish language has a plural form of almost every noun case (except the comitative, which is formally only plural).
 talo – house
 talot – houses
 taloissa – in the houses

However, when a number is used, or a word signifying a number (monta- many), the singular version of the partitive case is used.
 kolme taloa – three houses

and where no specific number is mentioned, the plural version of the partitive case is used
 taloja

and in the possessive (genitive)
 talon ovi (the house's door)
 talojen ovet (the houses' doors)

French
In modern Romance languages, nouns, adjectives and articles are declined according to number (singular or plural only). Verbs are conjugated for number as well as person. French treats zero as using the singular number, not the plural.

In its written form, French declines nouns for number (singular or plural). In speech, however, the majority of nouns (and adjectives) are not declined for number. The typical plural suffix, -s or -es, is silent, no longer indicating a change in pronunciation. Spoken number marking on the noun appears when liaison occurs.
 some plurals do differ from the singular in pronunciation; for example, masculine singulars in -al  sometimes form masculine plurals in -aux .
 Proper nouns are not pluralized, even in writing. (Les voitures, but Les Peugeot 404)

Normally, the article or determiner is the primary spoken indicator of number.

Hebrew
In Modern Hebrew, a Semitic language, most nouns have only singular and plural forms, such as ספר  "book" and ספרים  "books", but some have distinct dual forms using a distinct dual suffix (largely nouns pertaining to numbers or time, such as אלפיים  "two thousand" and שבועיים  "two weeks"), some use this dual suffix for their regular plurals (largely body parts that tend to come in pairs, such as עיניים  "eyes", as well as some that do not, such as שיניים  "teeth"), and some are inherently dual (such as מכנסיים  "pants" and אופניים  "bicycle"). Adjectives, verbs, and pronouns agree with their subjects' or antecedents' numbers, but only have a two-way distinction between singular and plural; dual nouns entail plural adjectives, verbs, and pronouns.

Mortlockese 
The Mortlockese language of the Mortlock Islands uses a base 10 counting system. Pronouns, nouns and demonstratives are used exclusively in the singular and plural forms through the use of classifiers, suffixes and prefixes. There are no other dual or trial grammatical forms in the Mortlockese language. Different forms that can be used in the language include first person singular and plural words, second person singular words like "umwi," second person plural words like "aumi" used to refer to an outside group, and third person plural words.

Russian

Modern Russian has a singular vs plural number system, but the declension of noun phrases containing numeral expressions follows complex rules. For example, "У меня (есть) одна книга/три книги/пять книг" ("I have one book-nom. sing./three book-gen. sing./five book-gen. plur."). See Dual number: Slavic languages for a discussion of number phrases in Russian and other Slavic languages.

The numeral "one" also has a plural form, used with pluralia tantum: одни джинсы/одни часы "one pair of jeans, one clock". The same form is used with countable nouns in meaning "only": Кругом одни идиоты "There are only idiots around".

Swedish
Swedish inflects nouns in singular and plural. The plural of the noun is usually obtained by adding a suffix, according to the noun's declension. The suffixes are as follows: -or in the 1st declension (e.g. flicka – flickor), -ar in the 2nd (e.g. bil – bilar), -er in the 3rd (e.g. katt – katter), -n in the 4th (e.g. äpple – äpplen) and no inflectional suffix is added for the nouns in the 5th declension (e.g. bord – bord). Verbs in Swedish do not distinguish singular from plural number, but adjectives do.

Wuvulu-Aua
Wuvulu is an Austronesian language spoken on Wuvulu Island located in the Manus Province of Papua New Guinea. The language's numbering system is multiplicative construction, where each number is based on multiplying pre-existing numbers smaller than five. Wuvulu is most similar to most Oceanic languages, and their numbering system is representative of some systems found in the Marshall Islands. For example, the number two in Wuvulu is roa, and the number four in both Proto-Oceanic language and Wuvulu is fa. Therefore, the number eight in Wuvulu is constructed from two and four, resulting in fainaroa, translating into "four multiply two". Moreover, the Wuvulu language has different numerical systems for animate objects and inanimate objects. When referencing an inanimate object, the number seven is oloompalo; however, if it is an animate object, the word changes to oloromea. The structure of a noun phrase looks like NP=(ART/DEMONSTRATIVE+)(NUMBER/QUANTIFIER+)(PREMODIFIERS+)NOUN(+MODIFER.) The number or quantifier appears in the middle of the noun phrase.

Types of number

Singular versus plural

In most languages with grammatical number, nouns, and sometimes other parts of speech, have two forms, the singular, for one instance of a concept, and the plural, for more than one instance. Usually, the singular is the unmarked form of a word, and the plural is obtained by inflecting the singular. This is the case in English: car/cars, box/boxes, man/men. There may be exceptional nouns whose plural form is identical to the singular form: one sheep/two sheep (which is not the same as nouns that have only one number).

Singulative versus collective

Some languages differentiate between an unmarked form, the collective, which is indifferent in respect to number, and a marked form for single entities, called the singulative in this context. For example, in Welsh, moch ("pigs") is a basic form, whereas a suffix is added to form mochyn ("pig"). It is the collective form which is more basic, and it is used as an adjectival modifier, e.g. cig moch ("pig meat", "pork"). The collective form is therefore similar in many respects to an English mass noun like "rice", which in fact refers to a collection of items which are logically countable. However, English has no productive process of forming singulative nouns (just phrases such as "a grain of rice"). Therefore, English cannot be said to have a singulative number.

In other languages, singulatives can be regularly formed from collective nouns; e.g. Standard Arabic  tuffāḥ "apple" →  tuffāḥah  "(individual) apple",  baqar "cattle" →  baqarah   "(single) cow". In Russian, the suffix for forming singulative form is -ин- -in-; e.g. град grad "hail" → градина gradina "hailstone", лёд lyod "ice" → льдина l'dina "block of ice". In both Russian and Arabic, the singulative form always takes on the feminine gender.  In Dutch, singulative forms of collective nouns are occasionally made by diminutives: snoep "sweets, candy" → snoepje "sweet, piece of candy". These singulatives can be pluralised like most other nouns: snoepjes "several sweets, pieces of candy".

Dual

The distinction between a "singular" number (one) and a "plural" number (more than one) found in English is not the only possible classification. Another one is "singular" (one), "dual" (two) and "plural" (more than two). Dual number existed in Proto-Indo-European, persisted in many ancient Indo-European languages that descended from it—Sanskrit, Ancient Greek, Gothic, Old Norse, and Old English for example—and can still be found in a few modern Indo-European languages such as Slovene. Many more modern Indo-European languages show residual traces of the dual, as in the English distinctions both vs. all, either vs. any, neither vs. none, and so on. Former dual forms may broaden their meanings to become paucal forms: Norwegian både, for example, though cognate with English both, can be used with more than two things, as in X sparer både tid, penger, og arbeid, literally "X saves both time, money, and labour".

Many Semitic languages also have dual number. For instance, in Arabic all nouns can have singular, plural, or dual forms. For non-broken plurals, masculine plural nouns end with ون  and feminine plural nouns end with ات , whilst ان , is added to the end of a noun to indicate that it is dual (even among nouns that have broken plurals).

Pronouns in Polynesian languages such as Tahitian exhibit the singular, dual, and plural numbers.

The dual may be restricted to certain morphological categories. For example, in North Saami, in possessive forms the possessor has three numbers (singular, dual, plural) whereas the noun possessed only has two (singular, plural).

Plural and trial
In contrast to 'singular' (one item) and 'dual' (two items), 'plural' refers to three or more items. The Oxford English Dictionary lists no word that specifically refers to three items. Several Austronesian languages distinguish numbers that refer to three items with pronouns and bound person agreement markers, e.g. Larike or the Oceanic languages Mussau, Raga, and Anejom̃, with Lihir even having distinct pronouns for trial and paucal. Also the Austronesian-influenced creole languages Bislama and Tok Pisin have the trial number in their pronouns.

Quadral
The quadral number, if it existed, would denote four items together. No known natural language has it, nor is there any proof that any natural language ever did. It was once thought to exist in the pronoun systems of Marshallese, spoken in the Marshall Islands in the Pacific Ocean, and in Sursurunga, in Tangga, and in several other Austronesian languages. While not all of these languages are adequately attested, it turns out that Sursurunga instead has both a "lesser paucal" (labeled "trial", but in fact referring to small groups, with typically three or four members) and a "greater paucal" (misnamed the "quadral", as it has a minimum of four, e.g. a pair of dyadic kin terms)—the distinction is along the lines of "a few" vs. "several"; —and that what Marshallese actually has is a trial and a paucal. None of them has a "quadral"; in at least two cases the field workers who originally suggested they did have a "quadral" were also the first to publish a peer-reviewed article contradicting that suggestion.

Paucal
Paucal number, for a few (as opposed to many) instances of the referent (e.g. in Hopi, Warlpiri, Lower Sepik-Ramu languages, some Oceanic languages including Fijian, Motuna, Serbo-Croatian, and in Arabic for some nouns). Paucal number has also been documented in some Cushitic languages of Ethiopia, including Baiso, which marks singular, paucal, plural. When paucal number is used in Arabic, it generally refers to ten or fewer instances.

Of the Indo-European languages, Kurmanji (also known as Northern Kurdish) is one of the few known languages with paucal number. For instance: "car-IN-an" (sometimes), cf. "gelek car-an" (many times) and "car" (time). Another example is "sêv-IN-an" (some apples), "sêvan" (the apples), "sêv" (apple). It can be applied to basically all nouns. In Russian, the genitive singular is also applied to two, three or four items (2, 3, 4 ка́мня – stones, gen. sg.; but 5...20 камне́й – stones, gen. pl.), making it effectively paucal (cf. э́тот ка́мень – this stone, nom. sg.; э́ти ка́мни – these stones, nom. pl.). Polish functions similarly: 'one dog' is jeden pies', while (2, 3, 4 psy – dogs, pl.; but 5+ psów – dogs, gen. pl.). Slovene has one more distinction. With its use of dual ('one dog' is en pes, 'two dogs' is dva psa), paucal is only used for counting 3 and 4 (3, 4 psi – dogs, pl.; but 5+ psov – dogs, gen.pl.).

Distributive plural
Distributive plural number is for many instances viewed as independent individuals (for example, in Navajo).

Superplural
Superplural is a grammatical number referring to "a lot of items", "heaps of items". This "massive plural" is in contrast to the normal "plural". For example, the Australian Aboriginal Barngarla language has four grammatical numbers: singular, dual, plural and superplural. For instance:
 wárraidya "emu" (singular)
 wárraidyalbili "two emus" (dual)
 wárraidyarri "emus" (plural)
 wárraidyailyarranha "a lot of emus", "heaps of emus" (superplural)

Formal expression
Synthetic languages typically distinguish grammatical number by inflection. (Analytic languages, such as Chinese, often do not mark grammatical number.)

Some languages have no marker for the plural in certain cases, e.g. Swedish hus – "house, houses" (but huset – "the house", husen – "the houses").

In most languages, the singular is formally unmarked, whereas the plural is marked in some way. Other languages, most notably the Bantu languages, mark both the singular and the plural, for instance Swahili (see example below). The third logical possibility, found in only a few languages such as Welsh and Sinhala, is an unmarked plural contrasting with marked singular. Below are some examples of number affixes for nouns (where the inflecting morphemes are underlined):

 Affixation (by adding or removing prefixes, suffixes, infixes, or circumfixes):
 Estonian: puu "tree, wood" (singular) – puud "the trees, woods" (nominative plural), or kolm puud "three trees" (partitive singular)
 Finnish: lehmä "cow, the cow" (singular) – lehmät "the cows" (nominative plural)
 Turkish: dağ "the mountain" (singular) – dağlar "mountains" (plural)
 Slovene:  "linden" (singular) –  "linden" (dual) –  "linden" (plural)
 Sanskrit: पुरुषस् puruṣas "man" (singular) – पुरुषौ puruṣau "two men" (dual) – पुरुषास् puruṣās "men" (plural)
 Sinhala: මලක් malak "flower" (singular) – මල් mal "flowers" (plural)
 Swahili: mtoto "child" (singular) – watoto "children" (plural)
 Ganda: omusajja "man" (singular) – abasajja "men" (plural)
 Georgian: კაცი k'aci "man" (singular) – კაცები k'acebi "men" (where -i is the nominative case marker)
 Welsh:  "children" (collective) –  "child" (singulative) 
 Simulfix (through various kinds of internal sound alternations):
 Arabic: كِتَاب kitāb "book" (singular) – كُتُب kutub "books" (plural)
 Welsh:  "birds" (collective) -  "bird" (singulative). The  suffix which adds an extra syllable to the root word causes the initial (and semantically empty) syllable to be dropped. The same process can be seen in the pair  "sock" and  "socks" where the plural suffix  causes the initial syllable to be dropped.
 Apophony (alternating between different vowels):
 Dinka: kat "frame" – kɛt "frames"
 English: foot – feet
 German: Mutter "mother" – Mütter "mothers"
 Welsh: bachgen "boy" – bechgyn "boys" 
 Reduplication (through doubling):
 Indonesian: orang "person" (singular) – orang-orang "people" (plural); BUT dua orang "two people" and banyak orang "many people" (reduplication is not done when the context is clear and when the plurality is not emphasized)
 Pipil: kumit "pot" (singular) – kuj-kumit "pots" (plural); similar to Indonesian, reduplication is omitted when plurality is marked elsewhere or not emphasized.
 Somali: buug "book" (singular) – buug-ag "books" (plural)
 Suppletion (the use of the one word as the inflected form of another word):
 Serbo-Croatian: čov(j)ek "man" (singular) – ljudi "men, folks" (plural)
 English: person (singular) - people (plural) (used colloquially. In formal and careful speech persons is still used as the plural of person while people also has its own plural in peoples.)
 Tonality (by changing a drag tone to a push tone)
 Limburgish: daãg "day" (singular) – daàg "days" (plural)
 Ancient Greek: γλῶσσα glôssa "tongue" (singular) – γλώσσα glǒssa "two tongues" (dual)

Elements marking number may appear on nouns and pronouns in dependent-marking languages or on verbs and adjectives in head-marking languages.

In the English sentence above, the plural suffix -s is added to the noun cowboy. In the equivalent in Western Apache, a head-marking language, a plural infix da- is added to the verb yiłch'ígó'aah "he is teaching him", resulting in yiłch'ídagó'aah "he is teaching them" while noun idilohí "cowboy" is unmarked for number.

Number particles
Plurality is sometimes marked by a specialized number particle (or number word). This is frequent in Australian and Austronesian languages. An example from Tagalog is the word mga [mɐˈŋa]: compare bahay "house" with mga bahay "houses". In Kapampangan, certain nouns optionally denote plurality by secondary stress: ing laláki "man" and ing babái "woman" become ding láláki "men" and ding bábái "women".

Classifiers with number morphology
In Sanskrit and some other languages, number and case are fused categories and there is concord for number between a noun and its predicator. Some languages however (for example, Assamese) lack this feature.

Languages that show number inflection for a large enough corpus of nouns or allow them to combine directly with singular and plural numerals can be described as non-classifier languages. On the other hand, there are languages that obligatorily require a counter word or the so-called classifier for all nouns. For example, the category of number in Assamese is fused with the category of classifier, which always carries a definite/indefinite reading. The singularity or plurality of the noun is determined by the addition of the classifier suffix either to the noun or to the numeral. Number system in Assamese is either realized as numeral or as nominal inflection, but not both. Numerals [ek] 'one' and [dui] 'two', can be realized as both free morpheme and clitics. When used with classifiers, these two numerals are cliticised to the classifiers.

Pingelapese is a Micronesian language spoken on the Pingelap atoll and on two of the eastern Caroline Islands, called the high island of Pohnpei. In Pingelapese, the meaning, use, or shape of an object can be expressed through the use of numerical classifiers. These classifiers combine a noun and a number that together can give more details about the object. There are at least five sets of numerical classifiers in Pingelapese. Each classifier has a numeral part and a classifier part that corresponds to the noun it is describing. The classifier follows the noun in a phrase. There is a separate set of numerical classifiers that is used when the object is not specified. Examples of this is the names of the days of the week.

Obligatoriness of number marking 
In many languages, such as English, number is obligatorily expressed in every grammatical context. Some limit number expression to certain classes of nouns, such as animates or referentially prominent nouns (as with proximate forms in most Algonquian languages, opposed to referentially less prominent obviative forms). In others, such as Chinese and Japanese, number marking is not consistently applied to most nouns unless a distinction is needed or already present.

A very common situation is for plural number to not be marked if there is any other overt indication of number, as for example in Hungarian: virág "flower"; virágok "flowers"; hat virág "six flowers".

Transnumeral
Many languages, such as Chinese, Korean, Indonesian, Japanese and Malay, particularly spoken in Southeast and East Asia, have optional number marking. In such cases, an unmarked noun is neither singular nor plural, but rather ambiguous as to number. This is called transnumeral or sometimes general number, abbreviated . In many such languages, number tends to be marked for definite and highly animate referents, most notably first-person pronouns.

Inverse number 
The languages of the Tanoan family have three numbers – singular, dual, and plural – and exhibit an unusual system of marking number, called inverse number (or number toggling). In this scheme, every countable noun has what might be called its "inherent" or "expected" numbers, and is unmarked for these. When a noun appears in an "inverse" (atypical) number, it is inflected to mark this. For example, in Jemez, where nouns take the ending -sh to denote an inverse number, there are four noun classes which inflect for number as follows:

As can be seen, class-I nouns are inherently singular, class-II nouns are inherently plural, class-III nouns are inherently singular or plural. Class-IV nouns cannot be counted and are never marked with -sh.*

A similar system is seen in Kiowa (Kiowa is distantly related to Tanoan languages like Jemez):

(See also Taos language: Number inflection for a description of inverse number suffixes in another Tanoan language.)

Number agreement

Verbs

In many languages, verbs are conjugated according to number. Using French as an example, one says je vois (I see), but nous voyons (we see). The verb voir (to see) changes from vois in the first person singular to voyons in the plural. In everyday English, this often happens in the third person (she sees, they see), but not in other grammatical persons, except with the verb to be.

Adjectives and determiners
Adjectives often agree with the number of the noun they modify. For example, in French, one says un grand arbre  "a tall tree", but deux grands arbres  "two tall trees". The singular adjective grand becomes grands in the plural, unlike English "tall", which remains unchanged.

Other determiners may agree with number. In English, the demonstratives "this", "that" change to "these", "those" in the plural, and the indefinite article "a", "an" is either omitted or changes to "some". In French and German, the definite articles have gender distinctions in the singular but not the plural. In Italian, Spanish and Portuguese, both definite and indefinite articles are inflected for gender and number, e.g. Portuguese o, a "the" (singular, masc./fem.), os, as "the" (plural, masc./fem.); um, uma "a(n)" (singular, masc./fem.), uns, umas "some" (plural, masc./fem.), dois, duas "two" (plural, masc./fem.),

In the Finnish sentence Yöt ovat pimeitä "Nights are dark", each word referring to the plural noun yöt "nights" ("night" = yö) is pluralized (night- is- dark--partitive).

Exceptions 

Sometimes, grammatical number will not represent the actual quantity, a form-meaning mismatch. For example, in Ancient Greek neuter plurals took a singular verb. The plural form of a pronoun may also be applied to a single individual as a sign of importance, respect or generality, as in the pluralis majestatis, the T–V distinction, and the generic "you", found in many languages, or, in English, when using the singular "they" for gender-neutrality.

In Arabic, the plural of a non-human noun (one that refers to an animal or to an inanimate entity regardless of whether the noun is grammatically masculine or feminine in the singular) is treated as feminine singular—this is called the inanimate plural. For example:
 رجل جميل (rajul jamīl) 'beautiful/handsome man': rajul (man) is masculine singular, so it takes the masculine singular adjective jamīl.
 بيت جميل (bayt jamīl) 'beautiful house': bayt (house) is masculine singular, so it takes the masculine singular jamīl.
 كلب جميل (kalb jamīl) 'beautiful dog': kalb (dog) is masculine singular, so it takes the masculine singular jamīl.
 بنت جميلة (bint jamīlah) 'beautiful girl': bint is feminine singular, so it takes the feminine singular jamīlah.
 سيارة جميلة (sayyārah jamīlah) 'beautiful car': sayyārah is feminine singular, so it takes the feminine singular jamīlah.
 رجال جميلون (rijāl jamīlūn) 'beautiful/handsome men': rijāl (men) is masculine plural, so it takes the masculine plural jamīlūn.
 بنات جميلات (banāt jamīlāt) 'beautiful girls': banāt is feminine plural, so it takes the feminine plural jamīlāt.
but
 بيوت جميلة (buyūt jamīlah) 'beautiful houses': buyūt (houses) is non-human plural, and so takes the inanimate plural (feminine singular) jamīlah.
 سيارات جميلة (sayyārāt jamīlah) 'beautiful cars': sayyārāt is non-human plural, and so takes the inanimate plural jamīlah.
 كلاب جميلة (kilāb jamīlah) 'beautiful dogs': kilāb is non-human plural, and so takes the inanimate plural jamīlah.

Collective nouns

A collective noun is a word that designates a group of objects or beings regarded as a whole, such as "flock", "team", or "corporation". Although many languages treat collective nouns as singular, in others they may be interpreted as plural. In British English, phrases such as the committee are meeting are common (the so-called agreement in sensu "in meaning"; with the meaning of a noun, rather than with its form, see constructio ad sensum). The use of this type of construction varies with dialect and level of formality.

In some cases, the number marking on a verb with a collective subject may express the degree of collectivity of action:
 The committee are discussing the matter (the individual members are discussing the matter), but the committee has decided on the matter (the committee has acted as an indivisible body).
 The crowd is tearing down the fences (a crowd is doing something as a unit), but the crowd are cheering wildly (many individual members of the crowd are doing the same thing independently of each other).

Semantic versus grammatical number
All languages are able to specify the quantity of referents. They may do so by lexical means with words such as English a few, some, one, two, five hundred. However, not every language has a grammatical category of number. Grammatical number is expressed by morphological or syntactic means. That is, it is indicated by certain grammatical elements, such as through affixes or number words. Grammatical number may be thought of as the indication of semantic number through grammar.

Languages that express quantity only by lexical means lack a grammatical category of number. For instance, in Khmer, neither nouns nor verbs carry any grammatical information concerning number: such information can only be conveyed by lexical items such as khlah 'some', pii-bey 'a few', and so on.

Auxiliary languages
Auxiliary languages often have fairly simple systems of grammatical number. In one of the most common schemes (found, for example, in Interlingua and Ido), nouns and pronouns distinguish between singular and plural, but not other numbers, and adjectives and verbs do not display any number agreement. In Esperanto, however, adjectives must agree in both number and case with the nouns that they qualify.

See also
 Count noun
 Elohim
 Generic antecedent
 Grammatical agreement
 Grammatical conjugation
 Grammatical person
 Inflection
 Measure word
 Names of numbers in English
 Noun class
 Plurale tantum
 Romance plurals

References

Citations

Works cited

.
.

General references

.

.
.

.
.
.
.
.
.
.

External links
 http://www.smg.surrey.ac.uk/features/morphosyntactic/number/ doi:10.15126/SMG.18/1.02